Disappearance at Clifton Hill (initially known as Clifton Hill) is a 2019 Canadian thriller film, directed by Albert Shin. The film stars Tuppence Middleton as Abby, a young woman who returns home to Niagara Falls, Ontario, when she inherits a family-owned motel in the city's Clifton Hill tourist district following her mother's death, and becomes obsessed with reconstructing inchoate childhood memories of witnessing a kidnapping.

The film's cast also includes Hannah Gross, Marie-Josée Croze, Andy McQueen, Noah Reid, Dan Lett, Aaron Poole, Connor Jessup, Elizabeth Saunders, and Maxwell McCabe-Lokos, as well as filmmaker David Cronenberg in a rare acting appearance as a local historian and podcaster. The film was nominated for four Canadian Screen Award nominations, including Best Supporting Actor for McQueen.

Plot

Fishing and picnicking with her family near their home at Niagara Falls, seven-year-old Abby sees a young boy, one eye covered by a bloody bandage, hiding in the woods. He gestures her to be quiet, but a couple drives up and drags him away, throwing him into the trunk of their car. Abby runs back to her family by the lakeside, but does not tell them what she has witnessed. Later she tells her sister, Laure, who does not believe her.

Many years later, the adult Abby returns to Niagara Falls following the death of her mother.  Abby has had various problems in her adult life, and among other things is a compulsive liar. Her mother ran a motel called The Rainbow, but the business is no longer viable. Laure wants to sell the motel to local businessman Charlie Lake, whose family has effectively owned the town for three generations, but Abby is reluctant to do this. She is still obsessed with the abduction of the “one-eyed boy.”

Abby unofficially moves back into the motel and starts to investigate the mystery, the local police having declined to get involved. After viewing microfiches at the local library, she finds a picture and a name, Alex Moulin. Alex was the son of a husband-and-wife magical act, the Magnificent Moulins, a huge local attraction at the time. Their act involved a live tiger. Alex Moulin disappeared around the time that Abby saw the boy in the woods, and was believed to have committed suicide by jumping over the Falls. Following his disappearance, his parents moved to the American side.

Abby meets local diving expert,  conspiracy theorist and podcaster, Walter Bell, who is of the opinion that Alex did not commit suicide, as no trace of his body was ever found.  Walter says that in his experience as a diver this is extremely unusual. Walter also says that Charlie Lake had a predilection for young boys, and that Alex was not the first to disappear. He believes the powerful Lake family covered up the disappearances.

In order to gain access to Charlie’s office, Abby pretends she has signed the papers authorising the sale of the motel (she has in point of fact signed them in disappearing ink). While at the office she sees a photo of the Moulins. With them is a woman who was one of the people who captured Alex at the lake. Abby finds out that the woman is called Bev Mole, and her husband Gerry (the other person at the lake) is now paraplegic. Bev worked with the Moulins as an animal trainer. She was once a regular gambler at a casino near The Rainbow Motel, but was eventually banned.

Abby obtains Bev Mole’s phone number, and pretends she is calling from the casino. She says the casino mistakenly placed a block on Bev’s account, and they’d like to welcome her back, including free accommodation at The Rainbow Motel. Bev accordingly checks in, with her wheelchair using husband.

When Bev goes to the casino, Abby enters her room and finds Gerry shut in a closet, his wheelchair chained so he can’t escape. But before Abby can talk to him about Alex, Bev returns, angry because she believes the casino were trying to “entrap” her. Abby hides as Bev leaves with her husband.

Abby uses her sister’s passport to travel to the American side, to see the Magnificent Moulins magic show, in which Mr. Moulin enters a cage and is apparently changed into a tiger. She approaches the couple after the show, produces a photo of Alex, and tells them to meet her across the street in the diner. The Moulins show up, assuming that Abby is trying to blackmail them. Mrs. Moulin tells Abby their son was “weak” and when he was unable to work in their act with the tiger, she hints that they fed him to the animal. Then she laughs and says it is all a lie.

Trying to return to the Canadian side, Abby’s stolen passport is queried and she is arrested. At the police station, with her sister and family attorney, various lies she has told about her recent past are exposed. With no one believing her about Alex, and no actual proof that the boy did not commit suicide, Abby’s investigations appear to have come to nothing.

However, determined to get to bottom of Alex’s disappearance, she finds out Bev Mole’s address and goes to her house, watching till Bev leaves. Inside the house, Abby finds Gerry chained up as before. He tells her that they kidnapped Alex, took numerous photos of the injuries he had sustained from the tiger attack (including the loss of an eye) and intended to use them to blackmail the Moulins.

Later, acting on Abby’s report, the police raid the house, rescue Gerry and arrest his wife. In the house they find the photos the Moles had taken of Alex's injuries.

In the following months, the case receives huge media coverage. Charlie Lake is arrested, although he claims he is innocent of killing Alex; similarly, the Moulins plead ignorance and innocence in the disappearance of their son. Abby has moved on and is working reception in another, more up-market, motel. A man checks in, wearing a black leather eye patch over his left eye. He is around the age Alex would have been, and bears a passing resemblance to him. He looks at Abby quizzically and asks if perhaps they've met before, as she seems somehow familiar. Abby is dumbstruck, unsure how to answer. Noticing a newspaper on the desk with Charlie’s picture, he tells Abby that Lake is not lying and states that in fact, he saved that boy’s life. Abby stares after him in wonderment as he leaves the reception area to check into his room.

Cast

Production
The film was based in part on Shin's own life; his parents formerly owned a motel in Niagara Falls, where Shin has childhood memories of witnessing what he understood at the time to be a kidnapping. However, during the making of the film, he faced resistance from the Clifton Hill business improvement association, because the organization feared that the film would paint the city and the district in a negative light.

Release
The film premiered at the 2019 Toronto International Film Festival under the title Clifton Hill. IFC Midnight obtained the U.S. distribution rights to the film and released it on February 28, 2020.

Reception

Critical reception 
The website's critics consensus reads, "While admittedly a bit less than the sum of its intriguing parts, Disappearance at Clifton Hill offers an entertaining diversion for noir fans." On Metacritic, another aggregator, the film has a weighted average score of 61 out of 100 based on 11 critics, indicating "generally favorable reviews."

Sheri Linden of The Hollywood Reporter praised the film, writing, "Between its opening image of a fish dangling on a hook (a stand-in for the audience?) and its flawlessly underplayed final moment, it casts a one-of-a-kind spell." Radheyan Simonpillai of NOW Toronto gave the film 4 out of 5 stars, writing, "Niagara's clash between gaudy neon lights, dingy diners, shadowy alleys and general David Lynch vibes sets the stage for a mystery that may only be imagined." Barry Hertz of The Globe and Mail gave the film 3.5 out of 4, writing that "Clifton Hill becomes just as thrilling and disturbing as its titular strip of haunted houses and fading-fast motels."

Conversely, Nick Allen of RogerEbert.com gave the film 2 out of 4 stars, writing, "Pulpy Canadian whodunit Disappearance at Clifton Hill is never as fun as it should be;" and fellow RogerEbert.com critic Brian Tallerico panned the film, writing, "Disappointingly flat in filmmaking terms, both in the lackluster design and dull performances." Scott Tobias of Variety also criticized the film, writing, "The deeper the film goes, the more it loses its grip."

Accolades

References

External links
 
 
 

2019 films
Canadian thriller films
English-language Canadian films
Niagara Falls in fiction
Films directed by Albert Shin
2019 thriller films
2010s English-language films
2010s Canadian films